Storkower Straße is a railway station in the Prenzlauer Berg locality of Berlin, close to the locality's border with Fennpfuhl.

History
The station was opened in 1881 under the name of Zentralviehhof, as the vast area south of the station then was the site of Berlin's central slaughterhouse that received animals by rail here. "Long Misery") crossed the processing plant connecting the station with the Friedrichshain residential areas.

The station was renamed in the 1970s, while in 1991 the slaughterhouse finally closed. The remaining portion of the bridge, which stretches from Storkower Straße north of the station to Hermann-Blankenstein-Straße south of the station, was renovated and now serves as the only entrance and exit to the station.

References

Storkower
Storkower
Storkower Strasse
Railway stations in Germany opened in 1881